Abigail Brown (born 10 April 1996) is an English rugby sevens player. She was selected as a member of the Great Britain women's national rugby sevens team to the 2016 Summer Olympics. She scored twice in their quarter-final match against Fiji to help Great Britain into the semi-finals.

She plays internationally for the England women's national rugby union team. She is a full-time contracted rugby player.

Brown attended Clyst Vale Community College in Broadclyst, Devon.

References

External links 
 RFU Player Profile
 
 
 
 
 
 

1996 births
Living people
Female rugby sevens players
Rugby sevens players at the 2016 Summer Olympics
English rugby sevens players
Olympic rugby sevens players of Great Britain
Great Britain national rugby sevens team players
Commonwealth Games medallists in rugby sevens
Commonwealth Games bronze medallists for England
Rugby sevens players at the 2018 Commonwealth Games
Rugby sevens players at the 2020 Summer Olympics
England international women's rugby sevens players
Medallists at the 2018 Commonwealth Games